Cas12a (CRISPR associated protein 12a, previously known as Cpf1) is an RNA-guided endonuclease of that forms part of the CRISPR system in some bacteria and is used by scientists to modify DNA. It originates as part of a bacterial immune mechanism, where it serves to destroy the genetic material of viruses and thus protect the cell and colony from viral infection. Cas12a and other CRISPR associated endonucleases are unique in that their use of a guide RNA makes this action highly selective; they only cut DNA when it is adjacent to a certain sequence of nucleotides. In the organisms from which it originates, this guide RNA is a copy of a piece of the genome from a virus that previously infected the cell.

It is of interest to researchers because it can be used to make highly targeted modifications of DNA or RNA, similar to the better known CRISPR/Cas9 system. Cas12a is distinguished from Cas9 by being smaller and simpler, not requiring a tracrRNA, and creating sticky rather than blunt ends at the cut site. These and other differences may make it more suitable in certain applications. Beyond its use in basic research, CRISPR/Cas12a could have applications in the treatment of genetic illnesses and in implementing gene drives.

Description

Discovery 

CRISPR/Cas12a was found by searching a published database of bacterial genetic sequences for promising bits of DNA. Its identification through bioinformatics as a CRISPR system protein, its naming, and a hidden Markov model (HMM) for its detection were provided in 2012 in a release of the TIGRFAMs database of protein families. Cas12a appears in many bacterial species. The ultimate Cas12a endonuclease that was developed into a tool for genome editing was taken from one of the first 16 species known to harbor it. Two candidate enzymes from Acidaminococcus and Lachnospiraceae display efficient genome-editing activity in human cells.

A smaller version of Cas9 from the bacterium Staphylococcus aureus is a potential alternative to Cas12a.

Classification 

CRISPR-Cas systems are separated into two classes: Class 1 uses several Cas proteins together with the CRISPR RNAs (crRNA) to build a functional endonuclease, while Class 2 CRISPR systems use only a single Cas protein with a crRNA. Under this classification, Cas12a has been identified as a Class II, Type V CRISPR/Cas system containing a 1,300 amino acid protein.

Name 
CRISPR (Clustered Regularly Interspaced Short Palindromic Repeats) is named for the features of the invariant DNA sequences involved in targeting. Cas12a was originally known as Cpf1 as an abbreviation of CRISPR and two genera of bacteria where it appears, Prevotella and Francisella. It was renamed in 2015 after a broader rationalization of the names of Cas (CRISPR associated) proteins to correspond to their sequence homology.

Structure 

The Cas12a locus contains a mixed alpha/beta domain, a RuvC-I followed by a helical region, a RuvC-II and a zinc finger-like domain. The Cas12a protein has a RuvC-like endonuclease domain that is similar to the RuvC domain of Cas9. Furthermore, Cas12a does not have a HNH endonuclease domain, and the N-terminal of Cas12a does not have the alpha-helical recognition lobe of Cas9.

Cas12a CRISPR-Cas domain architecture shows that Cas12a is functionally unique, being classified as Class 2, type V CRISPR system. The Cas12a loci encode Cas1, Cas2 and Cas4 proteins more similar to types I and III than from type II systems. Database searches suggest the abundance of Cas12a-family proteins in many bacterial species.

Functional Cas12a doesn't need the tracrRNA, therefore, only crRNA is required. This benefits genome editing because Cas12a is not only smaller than Cas9, but also it has a smaller sgRNA molecule (proximately half as many nucleotides as Cas9).

The Cas12a-crRNA complex cleaves target DNA or RNA by identification of a protospacer adjacent motif (PAM) 5'-YTN-3' (where "Y" is a pyrimidine and "N" is any nucleobase), in contrast to the G-rich PAM targeted by Cas9. After identification of PAM, Cas12a introduces a sticky-end-like DNA double- stranded break of 4 or 5 nucleotides overhang.

Mechanism 

The CRISPR/Cas12a system consist of a Cas12a enzyme and a guide RNA that finds and positions the complex at the correct spot on the double helix to cleave target DNA. CRISPR/Cas12a systems activity has three stages: 
 Adaptation: Cas1 and Cas2 proteins facilitate the adaptation of small fragments of DNA into the CRISPR array. . 
 Formation of crRNAs: processing of pre-cr-RNAs producing of mature crRNAs to guide the Cas protein.
 Interference: the Cas12a is bound to a crRNA to form a binary complex to identify and cleave a target DNA sequence.

Cas9 vs. Cas12a 

Cas9 requires two RNA molecules to cut DNA while Cas12a needs one. The proteins also cut DNA at different places, offering researchers more options when selecting an editing site. Cas9 cuts both strands in a DNA molecule at the same position, leaving behind blunt ends. Cas12a leaves one strand longer than the other, creating sticky ends. The sticky ends have different properties than blunt ends during non-homologous end joining or homologous repair of DNA, which confers certain advantages to Cas12a when attempting gene insertions, compared to Cas9. Although the CRISPR/Cas9 system can efficiently disable genes, it is challenging to insert genes or generate a knock-in. Cas12a lacks tracrRNA, utilizes a T-rich PAM and cleaves DNA via a staggered DNA DSB.

In summary, important differences between Cas12a and Cas9 systems are that Cas12a:
 Recognizes different PAMs, enabling new targeting possibilities.
 Creates 4-5 nt long sticky ends, instead of blunt ends produced by Cas9, enhancing the efficiency of genetic insertions and specificity during NHEJ or HDR.
 Cuts target DNA further away from PAM, further away from the Cas9 cutting site, enabling new possibilities for cleaving the DNA.

Origin 
Both Cas9 and Cas12 endonucleases ultimately originates from the TnpB endonuclease of IS200/IS605-family transposons. TnpB, not yet "domesticated" into the CRISPR immune system, are themselves able to perform RNA-guided cleavage using a OmegaRNA template system.

Tools 

Multiple aspects influence target efficiency and specificity when using CRISPR, including guide RNA design. Many design models and CRISPR/Cas software tools for optimal design of guide RNA have been developed. These include SgRNA designer, CRISPR MultiTargeter, SSFinder. In addition, commercial antibodies are available for use to detect Cas12a protein.

Intellectual property 
CRISPR/Cas9 is subject to Intellectual property disputes while CRISPR/Cas12a does not have the same issues.

Notes

References 

Genetic engineering
Enzymes
Genome editing